Saga Garðarsdóttir (born 6 August 1987) is an Icelandic stand-up comedian, actress and singer. She graduated from the Iceland Academy of the Arts in 2012. She is known for Hreinn Skjöldur, Steypustöðin and Stella Blómkvist.

Personal life
In 2014, Saga started dating musician Snorri Helgason. On 28 February 2018 Saga gave birth to their first baby.

Filmography

Film

Television

References

External links 

1987 births
20th-century Icelandic actresses
21st-century Icelandic actresses
Living people
Saga Gardarsdottir
Saga Gardarsdottir
Saga Gardarsdottir
Saga Gardarsdottir
Saga Gardarsdottir